David Macalister Silva Mosquera (born December 13, 1986 in Bogotá) is a Colombian football midfielder who plays for Millonarios FC in the Categoría Primera A.

Career

David Silva started his career in the lower divisions of Millonarios FC, where he played as a striker. His main features are link up play and technique on the right foot.
After two years in Millonarios, Silva was sent on a loan to Deportivo Pereira, a team for which he only had a few appearances. For the 2008 season, Silva returned to Millonarios.

After passing through Bogotá FC and Real Cartagena, David Silva signed with Deportes Tolima. Here he was a key player in the starting eleven and he even captained the team before returning to Millonarios once again in 2015. Now with a lot more experience to his name, Silva walked seamlessly into the Millonarios starting eleven that won the team's fifteenth league title on December 2017. As of 2019 he is the teams' second captain.

References

1986 births
Living people
Footballers from Bogotá
Colombian footballers
Categoría Primera A players
Millonarios F.C. players
Deportivo Pereira footballers
Bogotá FC footballers
Real Cartagena footballers
Deportes Tolima footballers
Association football midfielders